Ryan Ficken (born February 20, 1980) is an American football coach and former player who is currently the special teams coordinator for the Los Angeles Chargers.

Coaching career 
After spending a few years working with the offensive line at UCLA as a graduate assistant. In 2007 Ficken made the leap to the NFL becoming the assistant running backs coach for the Minnesota Vikings. In 2009 he would switch positions and become the assistant wide receivers coach. After the 2012 season Ficken again switched positions becoming the teams assistant special teams coach. For the 2021 season Ficken was named the Vikings special  teams coordinator replacing Marwan Maalouf.
He was hired by the Los Angeles Chargers on February 3, 2022.

Personal life 
Ficken and wife, Andrea, have three children, Wyatt, Jonathan, and Gianna. When at ASU, he was a member of Gamma Beta Phi, the National Scholastic Honor Society.

References

Living people
Minnesota Vikings coaches
UCLA Bruins football coaches
Year of birth missing (living people)
Coaches of American football from Colorado
Sportspeople from Aurora, Colorado
Los Angeles Chargers coaches
Arizona State University alumni